Repington v Roberts-Gawen (1881–82) LR 19 Ch D 520 is a leading English trust law case, concerning the requirement of intention to create a trust, and the requisite level of certainty in the beneficiaries.

Facts
Miss Roberts’ will said her bank annuities worth £8753, 5 shillings were to go on trust, “for life unto any immediate or direct descendants of my said brother or nephew who shall bear the name of Roberts-Gawen only, and from and after his or her decease, or in case of failure of any such immediate or direct descendant of my said brother or nephew who shall bear the name of Roberts-Gawen only,” upon trust for certain specified charitable societies. That was her brother’s new last name, who had an insane son and a daughter. The daughter had adopted her husband's name, and together they had a son (Miss Roberts' grand-nephew). By royal licence the grand-nephew assumed the name Roberts-Gawen. Then there were no other descendants. The question was whether the grand-nephew could inherit, given that the family name had changed.

Judgment

High Court
Hall VC held that the trust under the will was invalid. The trusts for subsequent life interests of the brother were void for remoteness. The grand-nephew appealed.

Court of Appeal
The Court of Appeal held the trust was not void but was instead limited because each descendant had a gift for life. Lord Jessel MR said the following.

See also

English trust law

Notes

References

English trusts case law
Court of Appeal (England and Wales) cases
1882 in case law
1882 in British law